Antiques & Artefacts is the eighth album by South African rock band The Parlotones. It was produced by Theo Crous, and was released on 12 April 2015 on Gallo. The album was recorded at Bellville Studios in Cape Town. It is their first album after leaving their record label, Sovereign Entertainment, and firing their manager, Raphael Domalik.

Track listing

Personnel
Kahn Morbee – lead vocals, rhythm guitar
Paul Hodgson – lead guitar
Glen Hodgson – bass guitar, backing vocals
Neil Pauw – drums

References

2015 albums
The Parlotones albums